Georg Ritter von Schönerer (17 July 1842 – 14 August 1921) was an Austrian landowner and politician of the Austro-Hungarian Monarchy active in the late 19th and early 20th centuries. A major exponent of pan-Germanism and German nationalism in Austria as well as a radical opponent of political Catholicism and a fierce antisemite, Schönerer exerted much influence on the young Adolf Hitler. He was known for a generation as the most radical pan-German nationalist in Austria.

Life and career

Early life
Schönerer was born in Vienna as Georg Heinrich Schönerer; his father, the wealthy railroad pioneer Matthias Schönerer (1807–1881), an employee of the House of Rothschild, was knighted (adding the hereditary title of Ritter, "Knight", and the nobiliary particle of von) by Emperor Franz Joseph in 1860. His wife was a great-granddaughter of R. Samuel Löb Kohen, who died at Pohořelice in 1832. He had a younger sister, Alexandrine, later director of the Theater an der Wien, who strongly rejected her brother's politics.

From 1861, Georg studied agronomy at the universities of Tübingen, Hohenheim and Magyaróvár (Ungarisch-Altenburg, today a campus of the University of West Hungary). He then conducted the business affairs of his father's estate at Rosenau near Zwettl in the rural Waldviertel region of Lower Austria, where he became known as a generous patriarch of the local peasants and great benefactor. 

Shaken by Austria's defeat in the 1866 Austro-Prussian War, the dissolution of the German Confederation, and the foundation of the German Empire in 1871, Schönerer became a political activist and ardent admirer of the German Chancellor Otto von Bismarck. He wrote passionately admiring letters to Bismarck, and continued doing so even after Bismarck made clear that he rejected any sort of Austro-German nationalism and would not allow Austria's pan-Germans to jeopardize the Dual Alliance.

Entering parliament
During the Panic of 1873, Schönerer was elected to Cisleithanian Austria’s Imperial Council as a liberal representative, but became a more and more extreme and vocal German nationalist as his career progressed. He became widely known for his oratory and was considered a firebrand in Parliament. He broke with his party three years later, agitating against "Jewish" capitalism, against the Catholic Imperial House of Habsburg, and against the Austro-Hungarian annexation of Bosnia and Herzegovina in 1878, which he condemned as a betrayal of ethnic German interests. In a speech, he said, "More and more, and ever more loudly, one can hear the German crown provinces exclaim: If only we already belonged to the German Reich and were finally rid of Bosnia and its entourage!" 

Schönerer's political beliefs were highly attractive to both socialists and national liberals, many of whom were still mourning the defeat of the 1848 Revolutions in the German States and the resulting failure to build a single nation-state for all ethnic Germans.

Tensions rose even further in 1879 due to the accession of minister-president Eduard Taaffe, a member of the Austrian nobility of Irish descent and whose Catholic, monarchist, and pro-minority policies so enraged Schönerer and his followers that they accused Taafe of being "anti-German." 

In 1882 Schönerer, Viktor Adler, and Heinrich Friedjung, drafted the Linz Program, which they proudly called "not liberal, not clerical, but national", of the Austro-German national movement, which became a major force in Imperial politics.   

The framers proposed either complete autonomy for the non-German-speaking Crownlands of Galicia, Bukovina, and Dalmatia or ceding all three to the Kingdom of Hungary. They further demanded that Austria's union with Hungary be reduced to having a common monarch, with no other administrative or legislative consequences. Additionally, German was to remain the sole official language of Austria, the Czech people in Bohemia and Moravia were to be coercively Germanized, and a Customs union, which was to be added to the constitution, was to strengthen ties between Austria and the German Empire ruled by the House of Hohenzollern.

Ironically, this manifesto fit in very well with the dreams of Polish, Hungarian and Croatian nationalists.

The anti-Slavic inclinations of the framers, however, are well represented in the following excerpt from their manifesto: "We protest against all attempts to convert Austria into a Slavic state. We shall continue to agitate for the maintenance of German as the official language and to oppose the extension of federalism ... [W]e are steadfast supporters of the alliance with Germany and the foreign policy now being followed by the empire."

In 1885, Ritter von Schönerer added an Aryan clause to his Party's Manifesto.

Adoption of antisemitism
During the 1880s, Schönerer came to consider his struggle for the German Austrians a fight against the Jews. By the peak of his career, he had transformed into a far-right politician. Schönerer developed a political philosophy that featured elements of a violent racial opposition to Jews that disregarded religious affiliations. His campaigning became especially vocal upon the arrival of Jewish refugees during the Russian Empire's pogroms, starting in 1881. He fiercely denounced the influence of "exploitative international Jews" and in 1885 had an Aryan paragraph added to the Linz program, which led to the ultimate breach between him and Adler and Friedjung.

Schönerer's approach became the model for German national Burschenschaften (student fraternities) and numerous associations in Cisleithanian Austria. In turn, Jewish activists like Theodor Herzl began to adopt the idea of Zionism. Schönerer's authoritarianism, popular solidarism, nationalism, pan-Germanism, anti-Slavism, and anti-Catholicism appealed to many Viennese, mostly working-class. This appeal made him a powerful political figure in Austria, and he considered himself leader of the German Austrians. Defying the Austrian education ministry's prohibition of pan-German symbols in schools and colleges, Schönerer urged German Austrians to wear blue cornflowers (known to be the favourite flower of German Emperor William I) in their buttonholes, along with cockades in the German national colours (black, red, and yellow), as a way to show pride in their German identity and dismissal of the multi-ethnic Austro-Hungarian Empire. Like many other Austrian pan-Germans, Schönerer hoped for the dissolution of the Austro-Hungarian Empire and an Anschluss with Germany.

Schönerer's movement had various strict criteria: it only allowed its members to be Germans; none of the members could have relatives or friends who were Jews or Slavs, and before any member could marry, they had to prove "Aryan" descent and be checked for health defects. Other pan-German movements generally followed suit by expelling Jews and generally Slavs as well.

Schönerer was addressed by his supporters as the "Führer," and he and his followers also used the "Heil" greeting, things Hitler and the Nazis later adopted. Schönerer and his followers often met during the summer and winter to celebrate German history and listen to German battle songs. Schönerer told his followers to prepare for a battle between Germans and Jews; he said, "If we don't expel the Jews, we Germans will be expelled!"

In 1888, Schönerer was temporarily imprisoned for ransacking a Jewish-owned newspaper office and assaulting its employees for prematurely reporting the imminent death of the German emperor Wilhelm I. His attack increased his popularity and helped members of his party get elected to the Austrian Parliament. Nevertheless, the prison sentence also resulted not only in the loss of his status as a noble, but also of his mandate in parliament. Schönerer was not reelected to the Imperial Council until 1897, while rivals like the Vienna mayor Karl Lueger and his Christian Social Party took the chance created by his disfavor to get ahead.

Schönerer left the Catholic Church in January 1900, and converted to the Lutheran denomination.

End of career in politics
In 1897, Schönerer helped orchestrate the expulsion of Minister-President of Cisleithania Kasimir Felix Graf Badeni from office. Badeni had proclaimed that civil servants in Austrian-controlled Bohemia must know the Czech language, an ordinance that prevented many Bohemian ethnic German speakers, most of whom did not speak Czech, from applying for government jobs. Schönerer staged mass protests against the ordinance and disrupted parliamentary proceedings, actions that eventually led Emperor Franz Joseph to dismiss Badeni.

During these years, while the Kulturkampf divided Imperial Germany, Schönerer founded the Los von Rom! ("Away from Rome!") movement, which advocated the conversion of all Roman Catholic German-speaking people of Austria to Lutheran Protestantism, or, in some cases, to the Old Catholic Churches. Schönerer became even more powerful in 1901, when 21 members of his party gained seats in the Parliament. But his influence and career rapidly declined thereafter due to his forceful views and personality. His party also suffered, and had virtually disintegrated by 1907. But his views and philosophy, not to mention his great skill as an agitator, influenced and inspired Hitler and the Nazi Party.

Death
Schönerer died at his Rosenau manor near Zwettl, Lower Austria on 14 August 1921. He had arranged to be buried near Bismarck's mausoleum on his estate at Friedrichsruh, Lauenburg, in present-day Schleswig-Holstein, northern Germany.

References

Bibliography 
 
 
 
 
 
 
 
 

1842 births
1921 deaths
Politicians from Vienna
Austrian Lutherans
Converts to Lutheranism from Roman Catholicism
Austrian knights
Constitutional Party (Austria) politicians
Members of the Austrian House of Deputies (1873–1879)
Members of the Austrian House of Deputies (1879–1885)
Members of the Austrian House of Deputies (1885–1891)
Members of the Austrian House of Deputies (1897–1900)
Members of the Austrian House of Deputies (1901–1907)
German nationalism in Austria
German nationalists
Austrian anti-communists
Anti-Slavic sentiment
Antisemitism in Austria
Germanization
Pan-Germanism
Anti-Masonry